In differential geometry, the isotropy representation is a natural linear representation of a Lie group, that is acting on a manifold, on the tangent space to a fixed point.

Construction 
Given a Lie group action  on a manifold M, if Go is the stabilizer of a point o (isotropy subgroup at o), then, for each g in Go,  fixes o and thus taking the derivative at o gives the map  By the chain rule,

and thus there is a representation:

given by
.
It is called the isotropy representation at o.

References 
http://www.math.toronto.edu/karshon/grad/2009-10/2010-01-11.pdf
https://www.encyclopediaofmath.org/index.php/Isotropy_representation

Representation theory of Lie groups